The 2017–18 Basketball League of Serbia B is the 12th season of the Second Basketball League of Serbia, the 2nd-tier men's professional basketball league in Serbia.

Teams

Promotion and relegation 
Teams promoted to the First League (1st-tier)
Zlatibor
Vojvodina
Teams relegated from the First League (1st-tier)
Smederevo 1953
Konstantin
Teams promoted from the First Regional League (3rd-tier)
Akademik
Žarkovo
Klik
Zdravlje
Teams relegated to the First Regional League (3rd-tier)
Futog Tupanjac MD
Srem
Jagodina
Rtanj

Venues and locations

League table

Statistics

Individual statistic leaders

Source: Eurobasket

See also
 2017–18 Basketball League of Serbia

References

External links
 Official website of Second Basketball League
 League Standings at eurobasket.com
 League Standings at srbijasport.net

Second Basketball League of Serbia
Serbia
Basketball